"Mona (I Need You Baby)" is a song written by Ellas McDaniel (Bo Diddley) and was the B-side to his 1957 single "Hey! Bo Diddley".
 
According to Diddley's obituary in The New York Times, "Mona" was a song of praise he wrote for a 45-year-old exotic dancer who worked at the Flame Show Bar in Detroit. The song also became the template for Buddy Holly's "Not Fade Away".

Craig McLachlan & Check 1–2 version

In March 1990, Australian actor and musician Craig McLachlan released a version with his band, Check 1–2, as the second single from their 1990 debut album, Craig McLachlan & Check 1-2. It was a commercial success, peaking at  3 in Australia and No. 2 in the United Kingdom. In Australia, it was the highest-selling single by a native artist in 1990.

Track listing

Awards

|-
| 1991 || "Mona" || ARIA Award for Highest Selling Single of the Year ||

Charts

Weekly charts

Year-end charts

Certifications

Cover versions
"Mona (I Need You Baby)" has been covered by many artists, including:
The Rolling Stones for their debut album in 1964 in the UK and on the US album The Rolling Stones, Now! in 1965.
T. C. Atlantic with a regional hit single in 1966.
The Troggs on their 1967 album Trogglodynamite.
Quicksilver Messenger Service for their second album, 1969's Happy Trails. It was ranked number 88 on the 100 Greatest Guitar Songs of All Time by Rolling Stone.
Grateful Dead performed the song twice - first with Bo Diddley on 25 March 1972 (released on Dick's Picks Volume 30) and then again on 27 October 1991 with guests Gary Duncan and Carlos Santana. 
The Roosters on their 1980 self-titled debut album.
Frank Marino and Mahogany Rush covered "Mona" on their 1980 album What’s Next.
Bruce Springsteen often interpolated "Mona" as an introduction to his "She's the One" on the Born to Run tours and Darkness Tour in the 1970s.
Bo Diddley performed "Mona" with Tom Petty and the Heartbreakers on March 28, 1999, at the Fillmore West.

References

1957 songs
Bo Diddley songs
The Rolling Stones songs
1990 singles
ARIA Award-winning songs
Songs written by Bo Diddley
CBS Records singles
Craig McLachlan songs